Martin Shaw (born 30 June 1947 in Driffield, Yorkshire, England) is a British sociologist and academic. He is a research professor of international relations at the Institut Barcelona d'Estudis Internacionals, emeritus professor of international relations and politics at Sussex University and a professorial fellow in international relations and human rights at Roehampton University. He is best known for his sociological work on war, genocide and global politics.

Academic career
In his Marxist period in the 1970s, Shaw published Marxism versus Sociology: A Guide to Reading and Marxism and Social Science: The Roots of Social Science. However, he developed a critique of Marxism, which he saw as incapable of fully analysing the problem of war, as he argued in Socialism and Militarism. He pioneered a new sociology of war and militarism, in his edited volume, War, State and Society and in Dialectics of War. In the 1990s he published two studies in this area: Post-Military Society and Civil Society and Media in Global Crises, a study of British responses to the 1991 Gulf War.

Shaw also entered debates in international relations, with his co-edited book State and Society in International Relations (1991) and his books Global Society and International Relations and Theory of the Global State: Globality as Unfinished Revolution. He founded The Global Site (2000), a portal for critical writing on global politics, culture and society, which also became a significant forum for academic debate after 9/11.

In the 2000s, Shaw's research returned to questions of war, now extended into the field of genocide, with four books: War and Genocide, The New Western Way of War: Risk-Transfer War and its Crisis in Iraq What is Genocide? and Genocide and International Relations.

In the late 2010s, Shaw's work turned to questions of racism and British politics, and he published Political Racism: Brexit and Its Aftermath, Newcastle upon Tyne: Agenda, 2022.

Shaw was appointed a lecturer in sociology at the University of Durham (1970–72) and was lecturer, senior lecturer and reader in sociology at the University of Hull (1972–94) before becoming professor of international and political sociology (1994). The following year Shaw moved to a chair of international relations and politics at the University of Sussex, where he became a research professor in 2008. He joined Roehampton University in 2010 and the Institut Barcelona d'Estudis Internacionals in 2011. He was a Leverhulme Fellow in 2000 and an ESRC research fellow in 2004 and 2005.

Activities, commentary and research
He was active in European Nuclear Disarmament (1980–85) and a member of its national committee, as well as in the Campaign for Nuclear Disarmament. He criticised what he saw as the passivity of the political left in the face of the genocidal wars in Bosnia (1992–95) and Kosovo (1998–99). He continues his political commentary by  writing for the website openDemocracy.

References

External links

Martin Shaw on Twitter
The Global Site
Interview with Martin Shaw by Theory Talks (18-04-2008)

1947 births
Academics of Durham University
Academics of the University of Hull
Academics of the University of Sussex
Alumni of the London School of Economics
British sociologists
Academics of the University of Roehampton
English socialists
Living people
Socialist Workers Party (UK) members
Members of Devon County Council
People from Driffield
Labour Party (UK) parliamentary candidates